Heteropeza is a genus of gall midges and wood midges in the family Cecidomyiidae. There are about six described species in Heteropeza.

Species
These six species belong to the genus Heteropeza:
 Heteropeza cathistes Pritchard
 Heteropeza pygmaea Winnertz, 1846
 Heteropeza transmarina Schiner, 1868
 Heteropeza ulmi (Felt, 1911)
 † Heteropeza marikovskii (Fedotova & Perkovsky, 2008)
 † Heteropeza pulchella Meunier, 1904

References

Further reading

 
 
 
 
 

Cecidomyiidae genera
Articles created by Qbugbot